38 Lyncis is a multiple star system in the northern constellation of Lynx. It located about 125 light-years from the Sun, based on parallax.

When viewed through a moderate telescope, two components—a brighter blue-white star of magnitude 3.9 and a fainter star of magnitude 6.1 that has been described as lilac as well as blue-white—can be seen. The fainter component is itself a close binary which can only be resolved using speckle interferometry. Two other faint companions listed in multiple star catalogues as components C and D are unrelated background objects.

38 Lyncis was given as a standard star for the spectral class of A3 V when the Morgan-Keenan classification system was first defined in 1943, apparently for the two components combined.

The primary star, component A, is a class A main sequence star around twice the mass of the sun. It has been listed as a λ Boötis star, although it is no longer considered to be a member. The fainter of the pair, component B, has been given a spectral class of A4V, although it consists of two very close stars. Their properties are poorly-known, even the difference in their apparent magnitudes can only be estimated to be approximately 2. Based on this, their masses are estimated to be  and  respectively.

References 

A-type main-sequence stars
4
Lynx (constellation)
Durchmusterung objects
Lyncis, 38
080081
045688
3690
M-type main-sequence stars